The Odd Family: Zombie On Sale is a 2019 South Korean zombie comedy film directed by Lee Min-jae, starring Jung Jae-young, Kim Nam-gil, Uhm Ji-won, Lee Soo-kyung, Jung Ga-ram and Park In-hwan.

Plot
Revolves around the Park family whose lives get disrupted after the elderly father gets bitten by a zombie.

Cast
 Jung Jae-young as Joon-gul 
 Kim Nam-gil as Min-gul 
 Uhm Ji-won as Nam-joo 
 Lee Soo-kyung as Hae-gul 
 Jung Ga-ram as Jjong-bi 
 Park In-hwan as Man-deok
 Shin Jung-geun as Chief Oh
 Oh Eui-shik as Constable Choi
 Jeon Bae-soo as Constable Park
 Kim Ki-cheon as Elderly man 
 Goo Bon-woong as Choon-sam

Production 
Principal photography began on October 13, 2017, and wrapped on January 21, 2018.

Reception 
The site's critical consensus reads, "An auspicious feature debut for director Lee Min-jae, Zombie for Sale puts a light yet surprisingly poignant spin on predictable genre formula."

References

External links
 
 
 

2019 films
2019 comedy horror films
Zombie comedy films
South Korean comedy horror films
South Korean zombie films
2010s South Korean films
2010s Korean-language films